Alice Josephine Orr-Ewing (born 7 July 1989) is a British actress who starred in the 2012 British film The Scapegoat, an adaptation of the 1957 novel of the same name by Daphne du Maurier.

Early life
Orr-Ewing was born in Hammersmith, London, the third child of the Hon. Robert James Orr-Ewing and Susannah (née Bodley Scott), and is the granddaughter of the Conservative politician Ian Orr-Ewing. She was educated at Heathfield School, Ascot, between 2001 and 2007, and trained at the London Academy of Music and Dramatic Art from 2008 to 2011.

Career
She had a small part in the 2007 film Atonement before taking up a place at drama school. Within two years of leaving LAMDA she had appeared in two feature films and two television series, including the last episode of Agatha Christie's Poirot. She then appeared in Mike Leigh's Mr. Turner, a biopic of the life of the painter J. M. W. Turner, and the biographical drama The Theory of Everything.

Filmography

References

External links

1989 births
British actresses
Actresses from London
Living people
Alumni of the London Academy of Music and Dramatic Art
People educated at Heathfield School, Ascot
People from Hammersmith